The Seeker may refer to:

Film and television
The Seeker (film), a 2007 film adaptation of the second book of the Dark Is Rising novel series
"The Seeker" (That '70s Show), a television episode

Music
The Seeker (album), by Cloud Cult, 2016
"The Seeker" (Dolly Parton song), 1975
"The Seeker" (The Who song), 1970
"(I Am) The Seeker", a song written by Benny Andersson and Björn Ulvaeus of ABBA, 1983
"The Seeker", a song by Steve Earle from The Revolution Starts Now, 2004

Other
The Seeker, a 1994 Dungeons & Dragons novel by Simon Hawke

See also
Legend of the Seeker, a 2008 television series based on the Sword of Truth novels by Terry Goodkind
Seeker (disambiguation)
Seekers (disambiguation), including uses of The Seekers